Toby Jason McGrath (born 11 October 1980) is an Australian rules footballer who played for South Fremantle in the West Australian Football League (WAFL).

Early career
McGrath was born in Northam, Western Australia. He has three brothers: Bradley, Cory and Ashley McGrath. McGrath played junior football in Katanning before being recruited to South Fremantle in the WAFL, where he made his debut in 1994.

AFL career
McGrath had a brief taste of the professional Australian Football League, when he was recruited from South Fremantle to the West Coast Eagles’ rookie list. He was delisted after spending a year on their list without  playing a game.  He was then given another chance by the Essendon Football Club in 2002 & 2003, where he played with his brother Cory, although again did not manage to make his senior debut.

Later WAFL career
He won the South Fremantle Football Club's Best & Fairest Award in 2004 and in 2005 he won both the Sandover, the WAFL’s prestigious best player award and Simpson Medal for the Best player in the Grand Final and was a member of South Fremantle’s premiership winning side. He represented WA on six occasions in 2000, 2004 and 2005, and was captain of the 2008 WA side that defeated Queensland in Townsville, 2009 and 2010.

In 2008 he was appointed captain of South Fremantle and played his 150th game for the Bulldogs while also winning his second Best & Fairest award.  In 2009, he played in his fifth WAFL Grand Final and captained South Fremantle to the WAFL premiership, his second after being a member of the 2005 team. He played his 200th game for South Fremantle in the final round of the 2010 season. In 2011 Toby McGrath was named in South Fremantle’s Indigenous Team of The Century and he in 2012 was included in the WAFL’s Best 25 players of the Last 25 Years.

McGrath is employed as a fireman with the Fire and Emergency Services Authority of Western Australia.  He has three brothers, Cory and Ashley who have both played in the AFL and Bradley. Marty McGrath and Dion Woods, who played for Richmond and Fremantle respectively, are both cousins.

References

External links
WAFL playing statistics

1980 births
Australian rules footballers from Western Australia
Bendigo Football Club players
Indigenous Australian players of Australian rules football
Living people
People from Northam, Western Australia
Sandover Medal winners
South Fremantle Football Club players